The 1940–41 National Football League was the 14th staging of the National Football League, an annual Gaelic football tournament for the Gaelic Athletic Association county teams of Ireland.

Mayo returned to the league and won a seventh title. Petrol rationing (due to The Emergency / Second World War) made the playing of the NFL prohibitively expensive and difficult and the tournament was suspended until the end of the war.

22 counties competed in the league.

Format 
There were four regional divisions, with 7 teams in the Southern Division and 5 in the Northern, Eastern and Western Divisions. Division winners played off for the NFL title.

Results

Northern Division
 won, from Fermanagh, Tyrone, Derry, Antrim.

Group B, Southern Division
 won, ahead of Kildare, Galway, Laois, Offaly, Wexford and Cork.

Group C, Eastern Division
 won, from Westmeath, Louth, Meath, Longford.

Group A, Western Division
 won, ahead of Cavan, Roscommon, Donegal and Sligo.

Knockout phase

Semi-finals

Final

References

National Football League
National Football League
National Football League (Ireland) seasons